Lai Pek Shan San Tsuen is a village in Tai Po District, Hong Kong.

Administration
Lai Pek Shan San Tsuen is one of the villages represented within the Tai Po Rural Committee. For electoral purposes, Lai Pek Shan San Tsuen is part of the Shuen Wan constituency, which was formerly represented by So Tat-leung until October 2021.

Shan Liu (including Lai Pek Shan and Lai Pek Shan San Tsuen) is a recognized village under the New Territories Small House Policy.

References

External links
 Delineation of area of existing village Lai Pek Shan (Tai Po) for election of resident representative (2019 to 2022)

Villages in Tai Po District, Hong Kong